Sporting Kristina (abbreviated Sporting) is a football club from Kristinestad, Finland. The club was formed in 1994 and their home ground is Kristinaplan. The men's football first team currently plays in the Kolmonen (Fourth tier in Finland).

Current squad

External links
Official Website

Football clubs in Finland
Association football clubs established in 1994
1994 establishments in Finland